Ratman (Italian: Quella villa in fondo al parco) is a 1988 Italian exploitation horror film directed by Giuliano Carnimeo.

Plot

Two models, Marlis and Peggy, are on a Caribbean Island for a photoshoot.
One night Peggy is found dead and her body seems eaten by rats.

The victim's sister, Terry, arrives on the island and helped by a mystery novel writer met at the airport starts to investigate.
Meanwhile, Marlis and the photographer find other corpses in the jungle.
Searching for help they stopped at an isolated house just to discover that the landlord is a scientist who created a ferocious mutant half-ape, half rat.

Cast

Release
Ratman was released in 1988.

Reception
Todd Martin of Horror News Network had praised the film for its gore and acting of Nelson de la Rosa and Eva Grimaldi but criticized the film for its long and boring scenes where blood and gore were not the factors. John White of The Digital Fix gave the film 7 out of 10, criticizing its visual presentation but also mentioning that "Those who love bad monster movies will open their heart to Ratman."

Home media
Ratman was released on DVD in the United Kingdom by Shameless Screen Entertainment on 31 March 2008. It was released uncut for the first time in its most complete version, containing its original aspect ratio of 1.85:1, and it also contains trailers for other Shameless DVD releases, a picture gallery and reversible cover art containing the new DVD release and the original poster-style cover.

References

External links

1988 films
Italian horror films
1980s Italian-language films
1980s exploitation films
Films directed by Giuliano Carnimeo
Films scored by Stefano Mainetti
1980s Italian films